Bulkeley is a town located in the province of Saint George, Barbados.

References 

Populated places in Barbados